Edgars Bertuks (born January 1, 1985 in Alūksne) is a Latvian orienteering competitor and world champion. He won the middle distance at the 2012 World Orienteering Championships in Lausanne, five seconds ahead of silver medalist Valentin Novikov.

References

External links
 
 

1985 births
Living people
Latvian orienteers
Male orienteers
Foot orienteers
World Orienteering Championships medalists
Competitors at the 2009 World Games